Blaža Klemenčič (born 1980 in Kranj) is a disgraced Slovenian cyclist, having tested positive for EPO in 2015 from a 2012 sample.  She competed in mountain biking at the 2008 Summer Olympics in Beijing, and at the 2012 Summer Olympics in London.

Doping case
Klemenčič was provisionally suspended by UCI in September 2015 for an EPO positive from a sample collected on 27 March 2012.

References

See also
List of doping cases in cycling

1980 births
Living people
Sportspeople from Kranj
Slovenian female cyclists
Olympic cyclists of Slovenia
Cyclists at the 2008 Summer Olympics
Cyclists at the 2012 Summer Olympics
Cross-country mountain bikers
Marathon mountain bikers
Cyclists at the 2015 European Games
European Games competitors for Slovenia
Doping cases in cycling
Slovenian sportspeople in doping cases